'''Institute of Sound may refer to:

British Institute of Recorded Sound  in London, England
Institute of Professional Sound
Institute of Sound and Vibration Research at the University of Southampton
Mexican Institute of Sound
Norwegian Institute of Recorded Sound in Stavanger